Open Secrets is a book of short stories by Alice Munro published by McClelland and Stewart in 1994. It was nominated for the 1994 Governor General's Award for English Fiction.

The Edmonton Journal called it "the best Canadian book of 1994."

Stories

 "Carried Away"
 "A Real Life"
 "The Albanian Virgin"
 "Open Secrets"
 "The Jack Randa Hotel"
 "A Wilderness Station"
 "Spaceships Have Landed"
 "Vandals"

References 

1994 short story collections
Short story collections by Alice Munro
McClelland & Stewart books